Arno Arts (born 26 June 1969) is a Dutch former professional footballer who played as a midfielder.

References

1969 births
Living people
Dutch footballers
Association football midfielders
NEC Nijmegen players
FC Luzern players
FC Twente players
SC Cambuur players
Willem II (football club) players
FC Utrecht players
VVV-Venlo players
Achilles '29 players
Eredivisie players
Eerste Divisie players
Swiss Super League players
Dutch football managers
NEC Nijmegen non-playing staff
Achilles '29 managers
Willem II (football club) non-playing staff
Dutch expatriate footballers
Dutch expatriate sportspeople in Switzerland
Expatriate footballers in Switzerland